Torch is the 10th studio album by American singer-songwriter Carly Simon, released by Warner Bros. Records, on August 1, 1981.

It was Simon's first album devoted to standards, namely torch songs, relating unrequited love or rejection. The album also features one Simon original, "From the Heart". The album was recorded during her marriage break up to James Taylor, which was announced shortly after the release of the album.

Reception

Writing in Rolling Stone, Stephen Holden called the album "a gorgeous throwback", stating Simon's "magnificent alto, with its rough-and-tumble lows and wistful highs, has never sounded better." He singled out the track "Not a Day Goes By" as "Torch's moment of truth", a "big, direct ballad", and "Simon's vocal makes you feel each stab of pain." He concluded "though Torch may be too sophisticated to storm the charts, it's nevertheless a superb example of modern mood music, performed with grace, gusto, sensuality, and intelligence."

In a retrospective review from AllMusic, William Ruhlmann similarly singled out the track "Not a Day Goes By", stating that Simon delivers it "with heartbreaking conviction."

Cover artwork
The man whose arm Simon is tugging on the cover is American actor Al Corley, known for playing Steven Carrington on the 1980s soap opera Dynasty. The photographer was Lynn Goldsmith.

Singles
"Hurt" was the only single released from the album. It just missed the Billboard Hot 100, peaking at No. 106 on the Bubbling Under Hot 100 Singles chart.

"Not a Day Goes By" was included on Simon's 2002 career spanning collection Anthology. "From the Heart" was included on Simon's 2015 career retrospective Songs From The Trees (A Musical Memoir Collection).

Track listing
Credits adapted from the album's liner notes.

Notes
 signifies a writer by additional lyrics

Personnel

Musicians

Production

Charts
Album – Billboard (United States)

Album – International

Singles - Billboard (United States)

References

External links
Carly Simon's Official Website

1981 albums
Carly Simon albums
Albums conducted by Marty Paich
Albums conducted by Don Sebesky
Warner Records albums
Traditional pop albums